Xénofolies is a Canadian short documentary film, directed by Michel Moreau and released in 1991. The film centres on the challenges of cultural integration at a racially diverse secondary school in Montreal.

The film was a Genie Award nominee for Best Short Documentary at the 13th Genie Awards in 1992.

References

External links 
 

1991 films
1991 documentary films
Canadian short documentary films
National Film Board of Canada documentaries
French-language Canadian films
1990s Canadian films